A list of films produced by the Bollywood film industry based in Mumbai in 1973:

Top-grossing films
The top ten grossing films at the Indian Box Office in 
1973:

A-Z

References

External links
 Bollywood films of 1973 at the Internet Movie Database

1973
Lists of 1973 films by country or language
Films, Bollywood